Less or LESS may refer to: fewer than,: not as much.

Computing
 less (Unix), a Unix utility program
 Less (stylesheet language), a dynamic stylesheet language
 Large-Scale Scrum (LeSS), a product development framework that extends Scrum

Other uses
 -less, a privative suffix in English
 Lunar Escape Systems, a series of proposed emergency spacecraft for the Apollo Program
 Christian Friedrich Lessing (1809–1862), (author abbreviation Less.) for German botanist
 Less (novel), a 2017 novel by Andrew Sean Greer

See also
 Fewer versus less
 Less is more (disambiguation)